The track and field teams of Florida State University, (variously Florida State or FSU), are currently coached by Bob Braman and compete in the Atlantic Coast Conference. 

The men's team has won fourteen indoor conference championships, thirty-five outdoor conference championships, and two outdoor national championships. The women's team has won four indoor conference championships, nine outdoor conference championships, four indoor national championships, and three outdoor national championships. In 2022, Trey Cunningham won the individual national title in hurdles and won the Bowerman Award.

History

The FSU men's Track & Field team won the NCAA National Championship three times in a row from 2005-2007.  Since 2006, Head Coach Bob Braman and Associate Head Coach Harlis Meaders helped lead individual champions in the 200 m (Walter Dix), the triple jump (Rafeeq Curry), and the shot put (Garrett Johnson) to consecutive outdoor national titles.  Individual runners-up were Walter Dix in the 100 m, Ricardo Chambers in the 400 m, and Tom Lancashire in the 1500 m.  Others scoring points in the National Championship were Michael Ray Garvin in the 200 m (8th), Andrew Lemoncello in the 3000 m steeplechase (4th), Rafeeq Curry in the long jump (6th), and Garrett Johnson in the discus (5th). In 2007, when FSU won its second straight men's Track & Field NCAA National Championship when Dix became the first person to hold the individual title in the 100 m, 200 m, and 4*100 m Relay at the same time.

The Florida State Seminoles have a new track and field building complex on the south end of Mike Long Track, the Mcintosh Track and Field Building, named after Michael A. Mcintosh. 

On February 7, 2010, the Seminoles vacated their 2007 Men's Outdoor Track and Field NCAA Championship in the wake of an academic cheating scandal.

Championships

Individual conference championships

Women

Indoor
60-meter Dash
Tonya Carter 
2000
Marecia Pemberton 
2014
55-meter Dash
Sheryl Covington 
1993, 1994
200-meter Dash
 Sheryl Covington 
1994
Tonya Carter 
2000
400-meter Dash
Samantha George 
2000
800-meter Dash
Erica Shepard 
1996, 1997
Rikke Ronholt 
1998
Laura Gerber 
1999
Mile Run
Natalie Hughes 
2004
Susan Kuijken 
2008, 2009
Pilar McShine 
2010
Amanda Winslow 
2011
Colleen Quigley 
2014, 2015
3000-meter Run
Amanda Winslow 
2012, 2013
5000-meter Run
Vicky Gill 
2004
60-meter High Hurdles
Kim Jones 
2002, 2003
Meme Jean
2016
4x400-meter Relay
1994, 1996, 1999, 2003, 2004, 2007
Distance Medley Relay
2004, 2006, 2008, 2009, 2012  
2013 (Winslow, Watson, Peel, Quigley)
2015 (Peel, Swanepoel, Over, Quigley)
Long Jump
Trinette Johnson 
1993
Kim Jones 
2002
Kimberly Williams 
2011
Amy Haris 
2012
Der'Renae Freeman 
2014
Triple Jump
Kimberly Williams 
2008, 2009, 2010, 2011
Shot Put
Shannon Cook 
1997
Makiba Batten 
2000
Kamorean Hayes 
2009
Kellion Knibb
2015
Pole Vault
Lacy Janson 
2002, 2003, 2005, 2006
Weight Throw
Lakeisha Mosley 
2000

Outdoor
100-meter  Dash
Deletea Bradley 
1995
Tonya Carter 
2000
Teresa Bundy 
2002
Marecia Pemberton 
2010
Shauna Helps
2016
200-meter Dash
Tonya Carter 
2000
Nakeya Crutchfield 
2002
Teona Rodgers 
2010
400-meter Dash
Sophia Danvers 
1997
Samantha George 
1999, 2000
Brittany St. Louis 
2009
800-meter Run
Erica Shepard 
1996, 1997
Laura Gerber 
1999
Samantha George 
2000
Laura Gerber 
2003
Hannah England 
2008
1500-meter Run
Natalie Hughes 
2004, 2006
Pilar McShine 
2009, 2010
Colleen Quigley
2015
5000-meter Run
Vicky Gill 
2004
Susan Kuijken 
2009
Jessica Parry 
2011
Hannah Brooks 
2012
3000-meter Steeplechase
Barbara Parker 
2006, 2007
Lydia Williemse 
2009
Jennifer Dunn 
2010
Colleen Quigley
2014
110-meter Hurdles
Kim Jones 
2002, 2003
400-meter Hurdles
Radhiya Teagle 
1994, 1995
Sage Watson
2015
4x100-meter Relay
2000, 2002, 2003, 2009
4x400-meter Relay
1994, 1995, 1996, 1997, 1999, 2000, 2003, 2006, 2007, 2009
High Jump
Indianne Henry 
1994
Long Jump
Trinette Johnson 
1992, 1993
Zuzette Mullings 
1998
Kim Jones 
2003
Kimberly Williams 
2008, 2009, 2011
Amy Harris 
2012
Der'Renae Freeman 
2014, 2015, 2016
Triple Jump
Alyce Williams 
2007
Kimberly Williams 
2008, 2009, 2010, 2011
Michelle Jenije 
2012
Pole Vault
Lacy Janson 
2002, 2003, 2004, 2006
Lizbeth Mabry 
2011
Shot Put
Shannon Cook 
1996, 1997
Makiba Batten 
2000
Hammer
Lakeisha Mose 
1998, 2000
Katja Vangsnes
2016
Heptathlon
Chinette Johnson 
1998, 1999, 2000
Grete Sadeiko 
2014
Melissa-Maree Farrington
2016
Discus
Kellion Knibb 
2014
Kellion Knibb
2016

Individual national championships

Men

Indoor

Outdoor

Women

Indoor

Outdoor

Honors
Indoor (Men)
ACC Most Valuable Performer
Phillip Riley (1994)
Tom Lancashire (2005)
Ricardo Chambers (2006)
ACC Championship MVP
Track
Maurice Mitchell (2010, 2011, 2012)
Stephen Newbold (2013)
Field
Phillip Young (2013) 
ACC Performer of the Year
Track
Andrew Lemoncello (2007)
Maurice Mitchell (2010, 2011, 2012)
Dentarius Locke (2014)
Field
Gonzalo Barroilhet (2008)
Ngoni Makusha (2009)
ACC Freshman of the Year
Rafeeq Curry (2003)
Walter Dix (2005)
Gonzalo Barroilhet (2008)
Stephen Newbold (2010)
ACC Coach of the Year
Terry Long (1994, 2003)
Bob Braman (2005, 2006, 2007, 2009, 2012, 2014)
Outdoor (Men)
ACC Most Valuable Performer
Craphonso Thorpe (2003)
Tom Lancashire (2005)
Rafeeq Curry (2006)
ACC Championship MVP
Track
Maurice Mitchell (2010, 2011, 2012)
Dentarius Locke (2013, 2014)
Field
Michael Putman (2011)
ACC Performer of the Year
Track
Walter Dix (2007)
Charles Clark (2009)
Maurice Mitchell (2011, 2012)
Dentarius Locke (2013, 2014)
Trey Cunningham (2022)
Field
Ngonia Makusha (2011)
Isaac Grimes (2021)
ACC Freshman of the Year
Matt Mason (2001)
Garrett Johnson (2003)
Walter Dix (2005)
Maurice Mitchell (2009)
Stephen Newbold (2012)
Kendal Williams (2015)
Sean Watkins, Jr. (2022)
ACC Coach of the Year 
Terry Long (2000, 2002, 2003)
Bob Braman (2005, 2006, 2007, 2011, 2013, 2014, 2015, 2021, 2022) 
Indoor (Women)
ACC Most Valuable Player
Sheryl Covington (1994)
ACC Performer of the Year
Field
Kimberly Williams (2010)
Michelle Jenije (2012)
ACC Freshman of the Year
Kimberly Williams (2008)
ACC Coach of the Year 
Bob Braman (2009, 2014)
Outdoor (Women)
ACC Most Valuable Performer
Radhiya Teagle (1995)
Tonya Carter (2000)
ACC Performer of the Year
Track
Colleen Quigley (2015)
Field
Kimberly Williams (2008, 2009)
ACC Freshman of the Year
Laura Bowerman (2005)
Lydia Willemse (2006)
Kimberly Williams (2008)
Sage Watson (2013)
Ruta Lasmane (2021)
ACC Coach of the Year 
Bob Braman (2009, 2013)

All-Americans

Men
Allen Williams
Mike Kelly 
Doug Brown
Phillip Parker
Ken Misner
Joel Garren
Danny Smith
Tyrone Frederick
Rudolph Falana
Charlie Harris
Jesse Forbes
Michael Roberson
Don Merrick
Phares Rolle
Bradley Cooper
Walter McCoy
Kevin Johnson
Ron Nelson
John Walker
Palmer Simmons
Earl Caruthers
Robb Gomez
Leon Hutchins
Herb Wills
Reggie Ross
Melford Boodie
Bobby Butler
Phillip Rolle
Rohn Stark
Chip Wells
Don Frost
Ronnie Taylor 
Lynn Brown 
Leon Hutchins 
Leander McKenzie 
Kenny Smith
Charlie Carr
Vince Washington 
Kevin Gordon
Thomas Johnson
Octavius Clark 
Clark Waddell
Carter Williams 
Arthur Blake
Horatio Garcia 
Arthur Blake 
Larry Carr 
Jeff Bray 
Kevin Crist 
Marcus Dixon 
Jonathan Carter
Kevin Ansley
Kelsey Nash
Phillip Riley
Lou Angelo 
John Rothell 
Justin Johnson
Byron Capers
Warrick Dunn
Jody Lawrence
Joe Allen
Shawn Brown
Mario Lowe
Joep Ticheglaar
Rafeeq Curry
Willie Johnson
Dorian Scott
Brian Dzingai 
Derrick Baker
Rhoan Sterling
Cedric Nabe  
Walter Dix 
Ricardo Chambers 
Garrett Johnson 
Andrew Lemoncello
Tom Lancashire
Kenny O’Neal
Greg Bolden
Michael Ray Garvin
Charles Clark 
Luke Gunn  
Tywayne Buchanan
Gonzalo Barroilhet 
Drew Brunson 
Ngoni Makusha 
Rayon Taylor  
Pablo Navarrete
Brandon Byram
Brian Chibudu
Matt Leeder 
Kevin Borlée 
Jonathan Borlée
Javier Garcia-Tunon
Pelle Rietveld 
Kevin Williams
Brandon O’Connor
Maurice Mitchell
Michael Putman
David Ambler
Andrew LaHaye 
Kemar Hyman
Phillip Young
Horatio Williams 
Michael Fout 
Stephen Newbold
Stefan Brits 
James Harris
Dentarius Locke
Morne Moolman 
Breandan O’Neill
Alonzo Russell
Paul Madzivire
Jonathan Reid 
Ricardo Roy
Michael Cherry
Kendal Williams
Zak Seddon

Women
Darien Andreau
Alice Bennett
Margaret Coomber
Esmeralda Garcia 
Randy Givens
Marita Payne
Angela Wright 
Debbie Moss
Scooby Golden
Janette Wood 
Tonja Brown 
Ovrill Dwyer-Brown
Carolyn Faison
Wendy Markham 
Kim Parrish
Carla Borovicka
Brenda Cliette 
Janet Davis
Michelle Finn
Kelly Hackler
Janet Levy
Nancy Rettie
Chris McKay
Brenda Moore 
Andrea Thompson
Kari Keith
Carol Samuels
Kim Batten
Sonya Blades
Trinette Johnson
Holly Kelly
Carmelia Shivers
Patrice Verdun
Lisa Horton
Carrie Boyd
Tracey Howze
Karla Severs
Angela Harris
Andi Lyons
Sheryl Covington
Indianne Henry
Sophia Danvers
Erica Shepard
Radhiya Teagle
Yashiva Edwards
Maria Embon
Shannon Cook 
Casey Custer
Zuzette Mullings
Rikke Ronholt
Tonya Carter
Samantha George
Makiba Batten
Laura Gerber
Teresa Bundy
Natalie Hughes
Lacy Janson
Kim Jones
Vicky Gill
Laura Gerber
Tamara Campbell
Shauna Quinn
Evelyne-Cynthia Niako
LaKendra McColumn
Alyce Williams
Susan Kuijken
Barbara Parker
Kandia Batchelor
India Pettus
Keyla Smith
Hannah England
Kimberly Williams
Teona Rodgers 
Tiara Swanagan
Allyn Laughlin 
Pilar McShine 
Nicole Marcus
Candyce McGrone
Danielle Jeffrey
Pasca Cheruiyot 
Jennifer Dunn 
Amy Harris
Amanda Winslow 
Michelle Jenije
Marecia Pemberton 
Stephanie Simpson
Brittany St. Louis 
Hannah Brooks
Violah Lagat
Astrid Leutert
Colleen Quigley
Chelsea Whalen
Linden Hall
Sage Watson
Jessica Parry
Georgia Peel
Brianna Cherry-Bronson 
Der’Renae Freeman
Kellion Knibb
Hannah Walker
Pippa Woolven 
Anne Zagre
Jande Pierce
Kali Davis-White

See also
Florida State Seminoles
Florida State Seminoles cross country
History of Florida State University
List of Florida State University professional athletes

References

External links
  Seminoles.com – Official website of the Florida State Seminoles track and field team.